Augustin Renaudet (9 January 1880 – 15 November 1958) was a French historian, and professor of the Collège de France. He was a specialist in humanism in early modern France and Italy.

Works

Les sources de l'histoire de France aux Archives d'État de Florence, des guerres d'Italie à la Révolution (1494–1789) (1916)
Préréforme et humanisme à Paris pendant les premières guerres d'Italie (1494–1517) (1916)
Le concile gallican de Pise et de Milan (1922)
Erasme, sa pensée religieuse et son action d'après sa correspondance (1518–1521) (1926)
Les débuts de l'âge moderne: la Renaissance et la Réforme (1929) with Henri Hauser
La Fin du Moyen Age (1931) with others
Études sur l'histoire de l'État prussien de 1714 à 1786 (1938)
Études sur l'histoire de la Réforme (1939)
Études érasmiennes (1521–1529) (1939)
Études sur la France du temps de Louis XIV (vie économique et sociale) (1940)
Machiavel - Étude d'histoire des doctrines politiques (1942)
La France de 1559 à 1610 (1944) Sorbonne course
L'Angleterre de 1714 à 1789 (1944) Sorbonne course
Histoire générale de l'Europe de 1559 à 1661 (1945)
Les Pays-Bas espagnols et les Provinces Unies de 1598 à 1714 (1946)
Dante Humaniste (1952)
Erasme et l'Italie (1955)
Humanisme et Renaissance (1958)
Erasme. Œuvres choisies

External links
 

1880 births
1958 deaths
French male non-fiction writers
20th-century French historians
20th-century French male writers